Ornipholidotos jacksoni is a butterfly in the family Lycaenidae. It is found in Cameroon, the Republic of the Congo, Gabon, the Democratic Republic of the Congo, Uganda, Kenya and Tanzania. The habitat consists of forests.

Subspecies
 Ornipholidotos jacksoni jacksoni (north-eastern Democratic Republic of the Congo, southern Uganda, western Kenya, north-western Tanzania)
 Ornipholidotos jacksoni occidentalis Libert, 2005 (Cameroon, Congo, Gabon)

References

Butterflies described in 1961
Ornipholidotos